Haagensen or Hågensen is a Norwegian surname. Notable people with the surname include:

Jonathan Haagensen (born 1983), Brazilian actor and model
Karl Haagensen (1871–1918), Norwegian gymnast
Nils-Øivind Haagensen (born 1971), Norwegian journalist and poet
Phellipe Haagensen (born 1984), Brazilian actor
Svein Haagensen (born 1939), Norwegian ice hockey player
Yngve Hågensen (born 1938), Norwegian trade unionist and writer

Norwegian-language surnames